James Leslie Kuplic (September 23, 1911 – July 22, 1968) was an American professional basketball player. He played for the Sheboygan Red Skins in the National Basketball League for two seasons and averaged 1.2 points per game.

After playing football, basketball, and tennis for Beloit College, Kuplic spent the 1934–35 year coaching all three sports at St. Norbert College. He assisted with the football and basketball teams and was the head coach for the tennis team. Kuplic also taught Japanese history while at St. Norbert. He did not enjoy coaching or teaching, so he left to go work in corporate America. During the late 1930s he played on numerous barnstorming teams in Sheboygan, Wisconsin while also officiating high school basketball games.

Kuplic died from a heart attack on his way to work on July 22, 1968.

References

1911 births
1968 deaths
American men's basketball players
Basketball coaches from Wisconsin
Basketball players from Wisconsin
Basketball referees
Beloit Buccaneers football players
Beloit Buccaneers men's basketball players
College men's tennis players in the United States
College tennis coaches in the United States
Forwards (basketball)
People from Manitowoc, Wisconsin
Players of American football from Wisconsin
Sheboygan Red Skins players
St. Norbert College faculty
St. Norbert Green Knights football coaches
St. Norbert Green Knights men's basketball coaches